TMW Systems is a developer of enterprise management software for the surface transportation services industry, including logistics, freight, trucking and heavy-duty repair and maintenance. The company was founded in Cleveland, Ohio and now has offices in Dallas, Indianapolis, Mayfield Heights, Nashville, Oklahoma City, Raleigh, Vancouver and Melbourne, Australia.

History
Following the Motor Carrier Act of 1980, which deregulated the trucking industry, Tom Weisz founded TMW Systems in 1983.

In 2005, Wachovia Capital Partners and PepperTree Capital Management acquired TMW Systems. In 2006, TMW Systems acquired Vancouver-based Maddocks Systems, Canada's largest provider of trucking software. TMW Systems also acquired Durham-based TMT Software Company, a fleet maintenance software provider, in May 2007. TMW Systems completed its acquisition of Integrated Decision Support Corporation in September 2007. In late 2009, TMW Systems acquired Innovative Computing Corporation of Nashville, an enterprise software company. In May 2011, TMW Systems announced the acquisition of Appian Logistics Software—a leading logistics and supply chain software provider.

On August 27, 2012, TMW Systems was acquired by Trimble of Sunnyvale, California for $335 Million in cash.

Today, TMW supplies solutions covering the transportation services sector. It supplies technology for improved operational efficiencies, improved transactional velocity, resource utilization and long-term profitability.

TMW Systems has customers in the trucking, 3PL, brokerage, private fleet, construction, municipal government, retail repair and waste management industries.

Products
TMW Systems products are broken down into four categories: Enterprise Transportation Software (for brokers, carriers, 3PLs and fleet operations), Optimization Software (for transportation), Asset Maintenance Software (for captive fleets or repair centers), and Appian Software (for logistics).

Enterprise Transportation Software
 TMWSuite
 TMW Go! (Apple iPhone app)
 TruckMate
 TL2000
 Innovative IES, Innovative Access and Innovative Access Plus

Optimization Software
IDSC Netwise
IDSC ExpertFuel
IDSC TripAlert
IDSC MatchAdvice

Asset Maintenance Software
TMT Fleet Maintenance
TMT Service Center
Cloud Services Hosting

in.sight
TMW Systems hosts an annual user conference called in.sight User Conference + Expo (formerly TransForum). The conference is open to other Trimble companies, vendors, and TMW customers. At the conference, TMW customers attend classroom sessions on TMW software, listen to guest speakers and network with TMW staff and other customers.

Notes

Project management software